Iggy Azalea is an Australian rapper. Her debut studio album The New Classic was released in April 2014. Azalea has been nominated for numerous major music awards including the Grammy Awards and the MTV Video Music Awards.

Azalea was included on the XXL's Top 10 Freshmen for 2012 by winning a competition for the tenth spot, becoming the first female, and first non-American rapper to be featured on the list. Azalea's first notable nomination was in 2013 by the MTV Video Music Awards where she was up for Artist To Watch for her debut single "Work". 2014 proved to be Azalea's mainstream breakthrough year as she was nominated for several awards from various events. Azalea won her first award from the American Music Awards taking home Favorite Rap/Hip-Hop Artist and Favorite Rap/Hip-Hop Album, while being the most nominated artist of the event in six categories. Azalea was nominated for MTV Video Music Awards, also making her the most nominated artist in the 2014 edition of that event, and won an award with Ariana Grande for Best Pop Video for the single "Problem". Azalea has been nominated for multiple awards in the Australian music industry such as the ARIA Music Awards including a win for Breakthrough Artist.

In 2015, Azalea received four nominations at the 57th Annual Grammy Awards for Best New Artist, Record of the Year and Best Pop Duo/Group Performance for "Fancy" and Best Rap Album for The New Classic. She won Favorite Hip-Hop Artist at the 41st People's Choice Awards. Azalea also led the 2015 iHeartRadio Music Awards nominations with five. She received twelve nominations at the 2015 Billboard Music Awards and won three awards. In 2016, Azalea was presented with the Woman of the Year award by GQ Australia. In 2017, Azalea was nominated for 'Most Buzz worthy International Artist' at the MuchMusic Video Awards for her single Mo Bounce.

American Music Awards
The American Music Awards is an annual music awards ceremony and one of several major American music awards shows. Azalea has received six nominations and two wins. 

|-
|rowspan="6"|2014
|rowspan="4"| Iggy Azalea
| Artist of The Year
|
|-
| New Artist of The Year
|
|-
|Favorite Female Artist - Pop/Rock
|
|-
|Favorite Artist - Rap/Hip-Hop
| 
|-
|"Fancy" (feat. Charli XCX)
|Single of The Year
| 
|-
| The New Classic
|Favorite Album - Rap/Hip-Hop
| 
|-
|}

Acervo Music Awards

|-
|rowspan="3"|2022
|Herself
|Best Global Rap Artist
|
|-
|}

ARIA Music Awards
The Australian Recording Industry Association Music Awards, commonly known as ARIA Music Awards are held to recognise excellence and innovation and achievement across all genres of Australian music. The inaugural ARIA Awards took place in 1987. Azalea has been nominated five times and won once.

|-
|rowspan="4"|2014
| Iggy Azalea 
| Best Female Artist
| 
|-
|rowspan="2"| The New Classic
| Breakthrough Artist - Release
| 
|-
| Best Urban Album
| 
|-
| "Fancy" (feat. Charli XCX)
|rowspan="2"| Song of the Year
| 
|-
|2015 
| "Trouble" (feat. Jennifer Hudson) 
| 
|-
|}

ASCAP
The American Society of Composers, Authors and Publishers (ASCAP) is a not-for-profit performance rights organization that protects its members' musical copyrights by monitoring public performances of their music, whether via a broadcast or live performance, and compensating them accordingly.

ASCAP Pop Music Awards

|-
|rowspan="3"|2015 
| "Fancy" (feat. Charli XCX)
|rowspan="3"|Most Performed Songs
| 
|-
| "Problem" <small>(Ariana Grande feat. Iggy Azalea)
| 
|-
| "Black Widow" (feat. Rita Ora)
| 
|-
|}

ASCAP Rhythm & Soul Music Awards

|-
|rowspan=4| 2015
| "Fancy" (feat. Charli XCX)
|rowspan=2| Award Winning R&B/Hip-Hop Songs 
| 
|-
|rowspan=2| "No Mediocre" (T.I. feat. Iggy Azalea)
| 
|-
|rowspan=2| Award Winning Rap Songs 
| 
|-
| "Fancy" (feat. Charli XCX)
| 
|-
|}

ASCAP Rhythm & Soul Music Awards 

|-
| 2016
| Classic Man 
| Award Winning R&B/Hip-Hop and Rap Songs
| 
|

Attitude Magazine Awards
The Attitude Magazine Awards have been presented annually by British gay lifestyle magazine Attitude since 2012. Azalea has been nominated once and won.

|-
| align="center"| 2013
|Iggy Azalea
|Breakthrough Artist
|

BBC Radio 1Xtra Hot Summer Awards
BBC Radio 1Xtra Hot Summer Awards have been handed out since 2013 by BBC Radio 1Xtra, a British digital radio station by the British Broadcasting Corporation (BBC) specialising in urban music. Azalea has received one win from one nomination.

|-
| align="center"| 2013
|Iggy Azalea
|Hottie of the Summer
|

BET

BET Awards
The BET Awards were established in 2001 by the Black Entertainment Television network. Azalea was nominated twice.

|-
| align="center"| 2014
|rowspan=2| Iggy Azalea
|rowspan=2| Best Female Hip-Hop Artist
| 
|-
| align="center"| 2015
|
|-
|}

BET Hip-Hop Awards
The BET Hip-Hop Awards are hosted annually by the Black Entertainment Television network for hip-hop performers, producers and music video directors. Azalea has been nominated for three awards and won once.

|-
|rowspan="3"|2014
|rowspan="2"|"Fancy" (feat. Charli XCX)
|Best Hip-Hop Video
|
|-
| People's Champ Award
|
|-
|Iggy Azalea
|Who Blew Up Award
|
|-
|}

Billboard

Billboard.com Mid-Year Awards
People can cast their votes for the annual Billboard.com's Mid-Year Music Awards after the first half of a calendar year is complete. Winners are announced at the beginning of July.

|-
|rowspan=7|2014
|rowspan=3|Iggy Azalea
| First Half MVP
| 
|-
|Breakout Star
|
|-
|Best Style
|
|-
|rowspan=2| "Fancy" (feat. Charli XCX) 
|Favorite No. 1 Hot 100 Song
|
|-
|rowspan=2|Best Music Video
|
|-
|rowspan=2| "Problem" (Ariana Grande feat. Iggy Azalea) (At Billboard Music Awards 2014)
|
|-
| Best Televised Performance 
|
|-
|rowspan=2|2015
|Iggy Azalea and Nick Young
|Hottest Couple
|
|-
|Britney Spears and Iggy Azalea Debut “Pretty Girls” Single
|Most Buzzed-About Moment
|
|-
|}

Billboard Music Awards
The Billboard Music Award is an honor given by Billboard magazine, a publication and music popularity chart covering the music business. Azalea received twelve nominations and won three in 2015.

|-
| align="center" rowspan=12| 2015
| rowspan=7| Iggy Azalea
| Top New Artist 
| 
|-
| Top Female Artist 
| 
|-
| Top Hot 100 Artist 
| 
|-
| Top Digital Songs Artist 
| 
|-
| Top Streaming Artist 
| 
|-
| Top Rap Artist 
| 
|-
| Billboard Chart Achievement Award 
| 
|-
| The New Classic
| Top Rap Album 
| 
|-
| rowspan=3| "Fancy" (feat. Charli XCX)
| Top Hot 100 Song 
| 
|-
| Top Streaming Song (Audio) 
| 
|-
| rowspan=2| Top Rap Song 
| 
|-
|"Black Widow" (feat. Rita Ora)
| 
|}

Billboard Women in Music Awards
The Billboard Women in Music Awards is an annual awards ceremony presented by Billboard magazine. Azalea was honored with an award on its 9th edition.

|-
| align="center"| 2014
| Iggy Azalea
| Chart-Topper 
| 
|-
|}

BreakTudo Awards
BreakTudo Awards (commonly known as BT Awards or BTD Awards) are Brazilian awards given annually aimed at the fields of music, film, television, and internet entertainment. Voting takes place via the official website and Twitter. Award nominees are chosen by entertainment professionals in Brazil and the organizing body of the ceremony, taking into account several criteria.

|-
|rowspan="3"|2022
|"Sally Walker"
|Clipe Internacional do Ano
|
|-
|}

Capricho Awards 
The Capricho Awards are an annual award show with categories consisting of music, television, film, internet, among others, created by popular Brazilian magazine Capricho, with voting open on Editora Abril's official website. Azalea has been nominated five times and she has won two times.

Channel V Australia
The [V] Oz Artist of the Year award is chosen by the Australian public, and presented annually by Channel V Australia. Azalea has been nominated twice.

|-
| align="center"| 2013
|rowspan=2|Iggy Azalea
|rowspan=2|V Oz Artist of the Year
|
|-
| align="center"| 2014
|
|-

Cosmopolitan Fun Fearless Female Awards
The Cosmopolitan Fun Fearless Female Awards is an annual awards show presented by Cosmopolitan magazine to celebrate Australian women. Azalea has been nominated once.

|-
| align="center"| 2014
| Iggy Azalea
| Favourite Singer 
| 
|-
|}

Glamour Women of the Year Awards
The Glamour Women of the Year is an annual award ceremony presented by English magazine Glamour. Azalea has received two nominations. 

|-
|rowspan="2"| 2015
|rowspan="2"| Iggy Azalea
| International Musician/Solo Artist
| 
|-
| NEXT Breakthrough
| 
|-

GQ Australia Men of the Year Awards
The GQ Men of the Year Awards are awarded annually by men's magazine GQ. Azalea won the Woman of the Year award presented by its Australian publication in 2016.

|-
| align="center"| 2016
| Iggy Azalea
| Woman of the Year 
| 
|-

Grammy Awards
The Grammy Awards are awarded annually by the National Academy of Recording Arts and Sciences of the United States. Azalea received four nominations in 2015, including Best New Artist and Record of the Year.

|-
| style="text-align:center;" rowspan="4"| 2015 
| Iggy Azalea
| Best New Artist
| 
|-
| rowspan="2"| "Fancy" (featuring Charli XCX)
| Record of the Year
| 
|-
| Best Pop Duo/Group Performance
| 
|-
|The New Classic
| Best Rap Album
| 
|-

Guinness World Records 

The Guinness World Records, known from its inception from 1955 until 2000 as The Guinness Book of Records and in previous United States editions as The Guinness Book of World Records, is a reference work published annually, listing world record both of human achievements and the extremes of the natural world. Azalea currently holds one record.

|-
| 2014
| Fancy
| Most weeks at No.1 on the US singles chart for a rap single by a female artist
| 
|

iHeartRadio Music Awards
The iHeartRadio Music Awards is an international music awards show founded by iHeartRadio in 2014 to celebrate the year's top artists and music played across iHeartMedia's network. Azalea received five nominations in 2015.

|-
|rowspan="5" | 2015
|rowspan="3"| Iggy Azalea
| Artist of the Year
| 
|-
| Best New Artist
| 
|-
| Renegade
| 
|-
| "Fancy" (feat. Charli XCX)
|rowspan="2"| Best Collaboration
| 
|-
| "Problem" (Ariana Grande feat. Iggy Azalea)
| 
|-

International Dance Music Awards
The International Dance Music Awards (IDMA) is an annual awards ceremony presented at the Winter Music Conference which is held every March since 1985 in Miami Beach, Florida.

|-
|rowspan="2" |2015
| "Fancy" (feat. Charli XCX)
| Best Rap/Hip Hop/Trap Dance Track
|
|-
| "Booty" (Jennifer Lopez feat. Iggy Azalea)
| Best Commercial/Pop Dance Track
|
|-
|}

MOBO Awards
The MOBO Awards (an acronym for Music of Black Origin) were established in 1996 by Kanya King and are held annually in the United Kingdom to recognize artists of any race or nationality performing music of black origin. Azalea has been nominated twice.

|-
| align="center"| 2013
|rowspan=2|Iggy Azalea
|rowspan=2|Best International Act
|
|-
|rowspan=2 align="center"|2014
|

MP3 Music Awards
The MP3 Music Awards (MMA) were established in 2007 to honour popular artists and quality MP3 players and retailers. Azalea has won one award.

|-
|2014
|"Booty" (Jennifer Lopez feat. Iggy Azalea)
| The BFV Award Best / Female / Vocalist
|
|}

MTV Awards

MTV Europe Music Awards
The MTV Europe Music Awards (EMA) were established in 1994 by MTV Networks Europe. Azalea has been nominated eight times and won once.

MTV Italia Awards
The MTV Awards are an annual show established by MTV Italia to celebrate the most popular music and events in Italy.

|-	
| align="center"| 2015
| Iggy Azalea
| Best Artist From The World	
|

MTV Millennial Awards
The MTV Millennial Awards were established in 2013 by MTV Latino.

|-	
| align="center"| 2014
|"Problem" (Ariana Grande feat. Iggy Azalea)
|Hit of the Year	
|

MTV Video Music Awards
The MTV Video Music Awards were established in 1984 by MTV to celebrate the top music videos of the year. Azalea has been nominated nine times and won once.

|-
| align="center"| 2013
|rowspan="1"|"Work"
|rowspan="1"| Artist To Watch
|
|-
|rowspan="8"|2014
|rowspan="4"|"Fancy" (feat. Charli XCX)
|rowspan="1"| Video of the Year
|
|-
|rowspan="1"| Best Female Video
|
|-
|rowspan="1"|Best Art Direction
|
|-
|rowspan="2"| Best Pop Video
|
|-
|rowspan="4"| "Problem" (Ariana Grande feat. Iggy Azalea)
|
|-
|rowspan="1"|Best Collaboration
|
|-
|rowspan="1"|Best Female Video
|
|-
|rowspan="1"|Best Lyric Video
|
|-
|}

MTV Video Music Awards Japan
The MTV Video Music Awards Japan are the Japanese version of the MTV Video Music Awards established in 2002.

|-
| align="center"| 2015
|"Problem" (Ariana Grande feat. Iggy Azalea)
|Best Female Video – International
|

mtvU Woodie Awards
The Woodie Awards were established by MTV in 2004 to recognise the best in music as voted for by college students. Azalea has been nominated twice.

|-
| align="center"| 2012
|Iggy Azalea
|Breakthrough Woodie
|
|-
| align="center"| 2014
|"Bounce"
|Best Video Woodie
|

MuchMusic Video Awards
The MuchMusic Video Awards is an annual awards ceremony presented by the Canadian music video channel MuchMusic. Azalea has received three nominations.

|-
| align="center"| 2014
| "Fancy" (feat. Charli XCX)
| International Video of the Year
| 
|-
| align="center"| 2015
| "Black Widow" (feat. Rita Ora)
| Most Buzzworthy International Artist or Group
| 
|-
| align="center"| 2017
| "Mo Bounce"
| Most Buzzworthy International Artist or Group
| 
|}

NewNowNext Awards
The NewNowNext Awards is an American annual entertainment awards show, presented by the lesbian, gay, bisexual and transgender-themed channel Logo. Launched in 2008, awards are presented both for LGBT-specific and general interest achievements in entertainment and pop culture. Azalea has been nominated once in 2014.

|-
| align="center"| 2014
|Iggy Azalea
|Best New Female Musician
|

Nickelodeon Kids' Choice Awards
The Nickelodeon Kids' Choice Awards, also known as the KCAs or Kids Choice Awards, is an annual awards show that airs on the Nickelodeon cable channel, that honors the year's biggest entertainment acts, as voted by Nickelodeon viewers. 

|-
| rowspan="4"|2015
| "Fancy" (feat. Charli XCX)
| rowspan="2"| Favorite Song of the Year
| 
|-
| "Problem" (Ariana Grande feat. Iggy Azalea)
|
|-
| rowspan="2"| Iggy Azalea
| Favorite New Artist
| 
|-
| Favorite Aussie/Kiwi Music Act
| 
|-
|}

NME Awards
The NME Awards are an annual music awards show founded by British weekly music publication NME. Azalea has been nominated once and won in 2015.

|-
| align="center"| 2015
|"Fancy" (feat. Charli XCX)
|Dancefloor Filler
|

NRJ Music Awards
The NRJ Music Awards were created in 2000 by French radio station NRJ in partnership with the television network TF1. Azalea has received two nominations.

|-
| rowspan="2" style="text-align:center;"|2014
| Iggy Azalea
|International Breakthrough of the Year
|
|-
|"Problem" (Ariana Grande feat. Iggy Azalea)
|International Song of the Year
|
|}

O Music Awards
The O Music Awards are one of the major annual awards established by Viacom to honor the art, creativity, personality and technology of music into the digital space. Azalea has been nominated once in 2012.

|-
| align="center"| 2012
|Iggy Azalea
|Best Web-Born Artist
|

People's Choice Awards
The People's Choice Awards is an American awards show established in 1974 that recognizes the people and the work of popular culture and is voted on by the general public. Azalea has received two nominations and won once.

|-
|rowspan=2 align="center"|2015
|rowspan=2|Iggy Azalea
|rowspan=1|Favorite Female Artist
|
|-
|rowspan=1|Favorite Hip-Hop Artist
|
|-
|}

Radio Disney Music Awards
The Radio Disney Music Awards (RDMA) is an annual awards show which is operated and governed by Radio Disney, an American radio network, and televised on Disney Channel.

|-
| align="center"| 2015
| "Problem" (Ariana Grande feat. Iggy Azalea)
| Song Of The Year 
| 
|-
|}

Rolling Stone Australia Awards
The Rolling Stone Australia Awards are awarded annually in January or February by the Australian edition of Rolling Stone magazine for outstanding contributions to popular culture in the previous year.

! 
|-
| 2023
| Iggy Azalea 
| Rolling Stone Global Award
| 
| 
|-

RTHK International Pop Poll Awards
The RTHK International Pop Poll Awards is an annual award show presented at RTHK Studio 1 that honors the best in international and national music established in 1989. Azalea has received one award.

!
|-
! scope="row" |2016
|"Fast And Furious 7" 
|Best Selling OST
|
|style="text-align:center;" | 
|}

Soul Train Music Awards
The Soul Train Music Awards is an annual award show aired in national broadcast syndication that honors the best in African American music and entertainment established in 1987. Azalea has been nominated two times in 2014.

|-
| align="center" rowspan=2|2014
|rowspan=1|"Fancy" (feat. Charli XCX)
|rowspan=2|Best Hip-Hop Song of The Year
|
|-
|rowspan=1| "No Mediocre" (T.I. feat. Iggy Azalea)
|
|-
|}

Teen Choice Awards
The Teen Choice Awards were established in 1999 to honor the year's biggest achievements in music, movies, sports and television, being voted by young people aged between 13 and 19. Azalea has won four awards from thirteen nominations.

|-
| align="center" rowspan=7| 2014
|rowspan=3| Iggy Azalea
| Choice R&B/Hip-Hop Artist
| 
|-
| Candie's Choice Style Icon
| 
|-
| Choice Summer Music Star: Female
| 
|-
|rowspan=3|"Fancy" (feat. Charli XCX)
| Choice Summer Song
| 
|-
| Choice R&B/Hip-Hop Song
| 
|-
|rowspan=2|Choice Single Female Artist 
| 
|-
|rowspan=1|"Problem" (Ariana Grande feat. Iggy Azalea)
| 
|-
|align="center" rowspan="4"|2015
|rowspan="2"|Iggy Azalea
|Choice Female Artist
| 
|-
|Choice R&B/Hip-Hop Artist
| 
|-
|rowspan="1"|Choice Movie Action
| "Fast And Furious"
| 
|-
|rowspan="1"|Choice Song: Female & Choice Music: Collaboration 
|"Pretty Girls" (Britney Spears & Iggy Azalea)
| 
|-
|align="center" rowspan="2"|2016
|Iggy Azalea
|Choice R&B/Hip-Hop Artist
| 
|-
| "Team"
|Choice R&B/Hip-Hop Song
| 
|}

The Boombox Fan Choice Awards 
The Boombox Fan Choice Awards are presented by American hip-hop online publication The Boombox since 2014. Azalea has received four nominations and won once.

UK Music Video Awards
The UK Music Video Awards are organised by two of the key members of the team behind bug www.bugvideos.co.uk, the bfi southbank's highly successful music video strand. Azalea has been nominated four times.

Urban Music Awards
The Urban Music Awards (UMA) is a hip-hop, R&B, dance and soul music awards ceremony launched by Jordan Kensington in 2003 and now held in six countries annually by the Invincible Media Group. Azalea has been nominated once.

Young Hollywood Awards
The Young Hollywood Awards are presented annually honouring the years' biggest achievements in pop music, movies, sports, television, fashion and more, as voted on by teenagers aged 13–19 and young adults. Azalea has won one award from three nominations.

|-
|rowspan="3"|2014
|Iggy Azalea
|Hottest Music Artist
|
|-
|"Fancy" (feat. Charli XCX)
|rowspan="2"|Song of the Summer/DJ Replay
|
|-
|"Problem" (Ariana Grande feat. Iggy Azalea)
|
|-
|}

4Music Video Honours
4Music Video Honours is an end of year fan voted award show presented by 4Music, a music and entertainment channel in the United Kingdom and available on some digital television providers in the Republic of Ireland launched in 2008, with the results being revealed on an annual TV special program.

|-
|2013
|rowspan=2|Iggy Azalea
|Best Breakthrough
|
|-
|2014
|Best Girl
|
|-
|}

Notes

References

External links
 

Azalea, Iggy
Awards